The 1976 Virginia Tech Gobblers football team was an American football team that represented Virginia Tech as an independent during the 1976 NCAA Division I football season. In their third year under head coach Jimmy Sharpe, the Gobblers compiled an overall record of 6–5.

Schedule

Players
The following players were members of the 1976 football team.

References

Virginia Tech
Virginia Tech Hokies football seasons
Virginia Tech Gobblers football